Super Junior D&E Asia Tour 2015 -Present- is the first Asia tour held by Super Junior-D&E to promote their first Korean extended play The Beat Goes On that was released last March under SM Entertainment.  Kicks off in Taipei on June 6, going through 4 Asia cities including Taipei, Hong Kong, Shanghai and Bangkok for 5 performances.

Tour dates

Set list

Personnel 
 Artist: Super Junior-D&E; Donghae and Eunhyuk
 Organizer tour: SM Entertainment
 Promotor tour: Dream Maker

References 

Super Junior D&E concert tours
2015 concert tours